Change of Pace is an album by jazz saxophonist Johnny Griffin which was recorded in 1961 and released on the Riverside label.

Reception

The contemporaneous DownBeat reviewer commented that the "ensemble blend creates a fresh sound which, by itself, gives several of these pieces a texture sufficiently different from the accustomed to set them apart". The AllMusic site awarded the album 3 stars. Duck Baker in the May 2000 JazzTimes referred to it as a great album revealing the arranging skills of the leader to a new extent, and that the two bass mix was effective.

Track listing
All compositions by Johnny Griffin, except as indicated.
 "Soft and Furry" - 3:43
 "In the Still of the Night" (Cole Porter) - 3:29
 "The Last of the Fat Pants" - 4:20
 "Same to You" - 4:25
 "Connie's Bounce" (Consuela Lee) - 4:01
 "Situation" (Julius Watkins) - 3:56
 "Nocturne" - 5:27
 "Why Not?" - 5:02
 "As We All Know" (Lee) - 4:46

Personnel
Johnny Griffin — tenor saxophone
Julius Watkins - French horn
Larry Gales, Bill Lee - bass
Ben Riley - drums

References 

1961 albums
Johnny Griffin albums
Riverside Records albums